The Skookumchuck River is a  long river located in southwest Washington, United States.  It is a tributary of the Chehalis River and thence to the Pacific Ocean. The Skookumchuck Dam was built in 1970, creating the Skookumchuck Reservoir. The dam provides water supply for the 1400-megawatt Centralia Steam Electric Plant and supplements flows for fish resources. The river begins with several tributaries in the Snoqualmie National Forest in the foothills of the Cascade Mountains, and flows west past the town of Bucoda, Washington to its confluence with the Chehalis River near Centralia, Washington.

The name Skookumchuck derives from Chinook Jargon: in this context, "rapids". The word skookum means "strong", and chuck means "water".

See also
List of Washington rivers
List of Chinook Jargon placenames

References

External links 
Thurston County - river data

Rivers of Washington (state)
Chinook Jargon place names
Rivers of Lewis County, Washington
Rivers of Thurston County, Washington